Pierina Legnani (September 30, 1863 – November 15, 1930) was an Italian ballerina considered one of the greatest ballerinas of all time.

Biography
Legnani was born on September 30, 1863, in Milan and originally studied with famous ballet dancer  at La Scala, where she developed her technical expertise. Her professional career took off when she appeared as prima ballerina in the Casati ballet, Salandra, at Alhambra Theatre in London. She was titled prima ballerina for La Scala in 1892, before moving to St Petersburg in 1892, where she reached fame dancing with the Tsar's Imperial Ballet at the Maryinsky Theatre until 1901.

Under the direction of famous ballet choreographer Marius Petipa, Legnani originated numerous roles including, Cinderella in 1893, Swan Lake in 1895, Raymonda in 1898, and La Camargo in 1901. She is widely reputed to be the first ballerina to perform 32 fouettés en tournant in the coda of the Grand Pas d'action of the ballet Cinderella.

The execution of 32 turns on pointe is a bravura achievement emphasizing the dancer's strength and technique. A sequence of 32 fouetté turns was later choreographed into the Black Swan solo in act 3 of Swan Lake and is still used to this day. Legnani was one of only two ballet dancers appointed prima ballerina assoluta at the Maryinsky Theatre.

Her last performance was in the Minkus/Petipa ballet La Camargo on January 28, 1901, after which she retired to live in her villa at Lake Como.

After retiring from the stage she lived in Italy and served on the examining board of La Scala Ballet School until 4 months before her death. She died on November 15, 1930.

Repertoire
Ballets of Marius Petipa featuring Pierina Legnani:
Cinderella from Petipa/Ivanov/Cecchetti (music by Fitingof-Shell, 1893), Legnani was the first to establish 32 fouettés en tournant.
The Talisman (music by Riccardo Drigo, 1895)
La Perle (music by  Drigo, 1896)
Raymonda (music by Aleksandr Glazunov, 1898)
Les ruses d’amour (music by Glazunov)
Coppélia (version from Petipa/Cecchetti, music by Léo Delibes, 1896)
The Cavalry Halt (music by Johann Armsheimer, 1896)

Gallery

References
Notes

External links

 

Pierina Legnani  (1863 – 1930) in Lev Ivanov's (1834-1901) revival of the choreographer Marius Petipa (1818-1910) and the composer Ludwig Minkus's (1826-1917) 1872 ballet La Camargo.

Prima ballerina assolutas
Italian ballerinas
Mariinsky Ballet principal dancers
1863 births
1923 deaths